Bernie Meli (born 22 July 1940) is an Irish boxer. He competed in the men's light welterweight event at the 1960 Summer Olympics.

References

1940 births
Living people
Male boxers from Northern Ireland
Irish male boxers
Olympic boxers of Ireland
Boxers at the 1960 Summer Olympics
Boxers from Belfast
Light-welterweight boxers